Sunset is an unincorporated village in the town of Deer Isle, Hancock County, Maine, United States. Sunset has a post office with ZIP code 04683.

References

Villages in Hancock County, Maine
Villages in Maine